Sergio Cubero Ezcurra (born 5 September 1999) is a Spanish professional footballer who plays as either a central defender or a right back for CF Fuenlabrada, on loan from SD Eibar.

Club career
Born in Mungia, Biscay, Basque Country, Cubero joined Athletic Bilbao's Lezama in 2015, from Romo FC. Released by the club in 2018, he moved to SD Eibar and joined their second reserve team in the regional leagues.

Cubero was promoted to the farm team for the 2019–20 campaign, Cubero renewed his contract until 2023 on 11 November 2019. He made his first team debut on 17 December, starting in a 5–0 away routing of SD Logroñés, for the season's Copa del Rey.

Cubero made his La Liga debut on 29 December 2020, coming on as a late substitute for Pape Diop in a 1–1 draw against FC Barcelona at the Camp Nou. The following 31 August, he was loaned to Primera División RFEF side SD Logroñés for the season.

On 17 August 2022, Cubero renewed his contract with the Armeros until 2025, and moved to fellow third division side CF Fuenlabrada also on a one-year loan deal.

References

External links
 
 
 

1999 births
Living people
Sportspeople from Biscay
Spanish footballers
Footballers from the Basque Country (autonomous community)
Association football defenders
La Liga players
Primera Federación players
Tercera División players
Divisiones Regionales de Fútbol players
CD Vitoria footballers
SD Eibar footballers
SD Logroñés players
CF Fuenlabrada footballers